A Woman Against the World is a lost 1928 American drama film directed by George Archainbaud and starring Harrison Ford, Georgia Hale, and Lee Moran.

Cast
 Harrison Ford as Schuyler Van Loan  
 Georgia Hale as Carol Hill  
 Lee Moran as Bob Yates  
 Harvey Clark as City Editor  
 Walter Hiers as Reporter  
 Gertrude Olmstead as Bernice Crane, Bride  
 William H. Tooker as Mortimer Crane, Bride's Father  
 Ida Darling as Mrs. Crane, Bride's Mother  
 Wade Boteler as Jim Barnes, Chauffeur  
 Charles Clary as Warden  
 Sally Rand as Maysie Bell  
 Rosemary Theby as Housekeeper  
 Jim Farley as Detective

References

Bibliography
 Gates, Phillipa. Detecting Women: Gender and the Hollywood Detective Film. SUNY Press, 2011.

External links

1928 films
1928 drama films
Silent American drama films
Films directed by George Archainbaud
American silent feature films
1920s English-language films
Tiffany Pictures films
Lost American films
American black-and-white films
1928 lost films
Lost drama films
1920s American films